The T.U. Lyon House is a historic house at 9 Warren Street in Stoneham, Massachusetts.  The modest -story Greek Revival house was built c. 1850 for T.U. Lyon, a shoe cutter.  At the time of its construction Warren Street had been supplanted as the major north–south road through Stoneham by the Medford-Andover Turnpike (now Main Street, Massachusetts Route 28).  Most of its distinctive Greek Revival features, including corner pilasters and a larger-than-typical frieze, have been lost due to recent residing of the exterior (see photo).

The house was listed on the National Register of Historic Places in 1984.

See also
National Register of Historic Places listings in Stoneham, Massachusetts
National Register of Historic Places listings in Middlesex County, Massachusetts

References

Houses on the National Register of Historic Places in Stoneham, Massachusetts
Houses completed in 1850
Houses in Stoneham, Massachusetts